In algebra, the absorption law or absorption identity is an identity linking a pair of binary operations.

Two binary operations, ¤ and ⁂, are said to be connected by the absorption law if:

a ¤ (a ⁂ b) = a ⁂ (a ¤ b) = a.

Examples of lattices include Heyting algebras and Boolean algebras, in particular sets of sets with union and intersection operators,  and ordered sets with min and max operations.

The same is true for intuitionistic logic.

The absorption law does not hold in many other algebraic structures, such as commutative rings, e.g. the field of real numbers, relevance logics, linear logics, and substructural logics. In the last case, there is no one-to-one correspondence between the free variables of the defining pair of identities.

See also
 Absorption (logic)

References

 
 

Abstract algebra
Boolean algebra
Theorems in propositional logic
Lattice theory